The 2005 Penn State Nittany Lions football team represented the Pennsylvania State University in the 2005 NCAA Division I-A football season. The team's head coach was Joe Paterno. It played its home games at Beaver Stadium in University Park, Pennsylvania.

Previous season
The Nittany Lions were coming off of back-to-back losing seasons, finishing 3–9 in 2003 and 4–7 in 2004, capping a stretch from late 1999 where Minnesota upset the #2 Nittany Lions with a late field goal until the goal line stand at Indiana that featured four of five seasons being losing seasons and the lone winning season in 2002 featuring many frustrating close losses. This stretch was called "The Dark Years", sometimes including 2002 as well. The team finished the 2004 season with wins over Indiana and Michigan State, which helped springboard momentum into the 2005 season that gave many optimism for the 2005 Nittany Lions.

Preseason
The team returned 18 starters from last year's squad. Eight starters returned on offense, led by starting quarterback Michael Robinson who has also played at wide receiver, tailback, and punt returner during his first three years at Penn State. Robinson played exclusively under center after the graduation of Zack Mills.

Nine defensive starters return from a unit did not allow more than 21 points in a game in 2004. Also returning was safety Chris Harrell who suffered a neck injury in 2003 and missed the 2004 season.

Michael Robinson, Alan Zemaitis, and Paul Posluszny were elected tri-captains of the football team in 2005. Posluszny was the first junior captain since 1968.

Penn State started the season unranked in both the AP and the Coaches college football preseason polls.

Recruiting class

Pre-season awards
 Alan Zemaitis
 Second-team Sporting News All-American
 Third-team Street & Smith's All-American
 First-team Sporting News All-Big Ten

Schedule
Penn State did not play Big Ten teams Indiana and Iowa this year.

Personnel

Roster

Coaching staff
 Joe Paterno – Head Coach
 Dick Anderson – Offensive Line (Guards and Centers)
 Tom Bradley – Defensive Coordinator and Cornerbacks
 Galen Hall – Offensive Coordinator and Running Backs
 Larry Johnson, Sr. – Defensive Line
 Bill Kenney – Offensive Tackles and Tight Ends
 Mike McQueary – Wide Receivers and Recruiting Coordinator
 Brian Norwood – Safeties
 Jay Paterno – Quarterbacks
 Ron Vanderlinden – Linebackers
 John Thomas – Strength and Conditioning

Game summaries

September 3: South Florida

Penn State opened the season by defeating the Bulls 23–13. In his debut as a full-time starter at quarterback, Michael Robinson struggled, finishing 9 of 15 for 90 yards and an interception that set up the Bulls' first touchdown. Robinson also ran for 39 yards on 18 carries but was sacked three times and lost two fumbles. Tony Hunt finished with a career-high 140 yards on 15 carries. Alan Zemaitis scored the Lions' first touchdown of the year on a fumble recovery.

The Nittany Lions also tried to show off two highly touted freshmen. Justin King, who played both ways in the game, made his first contribution with a 61-yard run on a reverse. Derrick Williams finished with 38 yards on three catches.

Punter Jeremy Kapinos landed three punts inside the 11 and was named the Big Ten Special Teams Player of the Week.

September 10: Cincinnati

Michael Robinson went bombs away to the Lions' speedy freshmen as Penn State defeated the Bearcats 42–24. The offense struggled in the first half, but Robinson hooked up with Justin King for a 59-yard touchdown in the third quarter, followed by a 41-yard bomb to Derrick Williams on the next possession. In the fourth quarter, Deon Butler hooked up with Robinson for a 45-yard touchdown. Robinson finished 11 of 17 for 220 yards, three touchdowns and an interception.

Penn State's backup quarterback, sophomore Anthony Morelli, made his season debut, finishing 4 of 5 passes and scoring the Lions' final touchdown on a 1-yard keeper.

September 17: Central Michigan

Penn State displayed an aerial attack rarely seen in Beaver Stadium as the Lions defense held the Chippewas to only 172 total yards for a 40–3 win. Michael Robinson finished 14 of 23 for 274 yards, three touchdowns and an interception. Two of those touchdowns were to Deon Butler in the second quarter for 54 and 24 yards. Terrell Golden caught the third touchdown, a 47 yarder in the third quarter.

Robinson was pulled halfway through the third quarter for backup Anthony Morelli, who finished 8 of 13 for 107 yards, including a 55-yard touchdown to Ethan Kilmer.

September 24: Northwestern

Michael Robinson led a come-from-behind 34–29 win against the Wildcats, but in the first half Robinson threw three interceptions and lost a fumble to dig a deep hole for the Lions. But the offense recovered in the second half and outscored the Wildcats 17–6 in the fourth quarter to escape with the win.

The defining drive came with two minutes left, trailing by two points. On a fourth-and-15, Robinson threw a 20-yard strike to tight end Isaac Smolko. Five plays later, Robinson lobbed a 36-yard pass to Derrick Williams who caught the ball, ducked to avoid a defender, and dashed into the end zone. Anwar Phillips picked off Northwestern's Brett Basanez to seal the win.

Williams' touchdown reception from Robinson was selected as the Pontiac Game Changing Performance of the week.

Linebacker Paul Posluszny recorded a career-high 22 tackles, the most by a Penn State player since 1977, and was named the Big Ten Defensive Player of the Week.

October 1: Minnesota

Penn State went to the power running game and tallied 364 yards on the ground en route to a 44–14 thumping of the Golden Gophers. Tony Hunt ran for 114 yards, and Michael Robinson ran for 112 yards, his first 100-yard rushing game, including a hard hit on Gophers safety Brandon Owens. Robinson never went down, but Owens was knocked out and needed help off the field, ending his football career with uprooted nerves in his spinal column. Hunt and Derrick Williams each scored two rushing touchdowns.

The defense held the Gophers to just 287 total yards and 13 first downs. (In contrast, Penn State had 35 first downs.) Minnesota tailback Laurence Maroney entered the game as the nation's leader in rushing yards and all-purpose yards, rushing for at least 100 yards in the last six games, and was considered by some to be the frontrunner for the Heisman. The Lions' defense held Maroney to only 46 yards on 16 carries.

After recording nine tackles, Paul Posluszny was named the Walter Camp National Defensive Player of the Week as well as the Big Ten Co-Defensive Player of the Week.

October 8: Ohio State

Penn State defeated the Buckeyes 17–10 in front of 109,839 fans, during a student White Out, at the time the second-largest Beaver Stadium crowd (topped later the same season by the home game versus Wisconsin). Michael Robinson threw for 78 yards and carried the ball 14 times for 52 yards and a touchdown. Calvin Lowry intercepted Ohio State QB Troy Smith and returned the ball to the 2-yard line, setting up Robinson's touchdown.

Ohio State, needing to score a game-tying touchdown, began their final possession on their own 11-yard line with under 4 minutes to play.  After moving the ball into Penn State territory, Tamba Hali sacked Smith at midfield, forcing a fumble recovered by Scott Paxson and allowing the Nittany Lions to run out the clock. Led by Paul Posluszny who had 14 tackles and a sack in the game, the Penn State defense held the Buckeyes to only 230 total yards.

Posluszny was named the Big Ten Co-Defensive Player of the Week, the first time that a Big Ten player has been named in three consecutive weeks. The team was named the Tostitos Fiesta Bowl National Team of the Week by the Football Writers Association of America.

The game was ESPN's second largest audience for a regular season college football game. That morning's ESPN's College Gameday, which broadcast from University Park for the first time since 1999, was the most-viewed edition of that program in its history.

October 15: Michigan

The Wolverines defeated the Nittany Lions 27–25 on the game's final play to hand Penn State its first and only loss of the season. It would cap a wild fourth quarter where the two teams would combine for 39 points and four lead changes. Down 10–3 in the fourth, the Lions would quickly strike twice, the first would be a Michael Robinson two yard keeper set up by a Tony Hunt 61-yard run. On the Wolverines next drive, Alan Zemaitis would strip Michigan quarterback Chad Henne during the tackle and returned it 35 yards for the score. Kicker Kevin Kelly would put Penn State up 18–10 after a picking up a bad snap on the extra point and running it in for the two-point conversion.

Michigan would score on its next two drives to go up 21–18, but the defense would get the ball back to Robinson, who would put together an 81-yard drive, including a 4th down and 7 yard conversion, and score on a 3-yard keeper with :53 left to give the Lions a 25–21 lead.

However, the game would come down to seconds. Michigan's final drive, fueled by a Steve Breaston kick return to midfield, started with an apparent interception that was later reviewed to be out of bounds. The Wolverines called timeout after a Henne pass completion with the clock stopped at :28. Michigan head coach Lloyd Carr called the officials over, and after a protest by Carr and a long conference, the officials reset the game clock to 0:30. Those extra two seconds would turn out to impact the outcome of the game. Six plays later, with 0:01 on the clock, Michigan would score the game-winning touchdown on a Henne pass to Mario Manningham.

Derrick Williams was lost for the rest of the season when he broke his left arm when tackled on a kickoff return late in the game.

October 22: Illinois

Penn State scored touchdowns on its first four possessions en route to a 63–10 rout of the Fighting Illini. The Illini scored an early field goal, but would never regain the lead. Michael Robinson led the charge with four touchdown passes on his first six completions, connecting with Ethan Kilmer, Patrick Hall, and twice with Deon Butler. Robinson would rush for two more in the second quarter before sitting out the rest of the game.

In the second half, Anthony Morelli quarterbacked a more conservative offense, attempting only two passes and constantly handing off to Austin Scott who had 57 rushing yards. Very late in the fourth quarter, the Illini scored their only touchdown of the game, to make the final score 63–11.

The defense did their share of scoring too. In the second quarter, Tim Shaw hit Illini quarterback Tim Brasic and forced a fumble, picked up by Dan Connor who ran it in 18 yards for the touchdown. In the third quarter, Nolan McCready, from Wyomissing, Pa, would return an interception 77 yards for the final Lions touchdown.

For his six touchdown performance, Robinson was named the Big Ten Offensive Player of the Week. Robinson's six touchdowns ties a school record set in 1917, and his career-high four touchdown passes ties an 88-year-old school record. The Nittany Lions' 56 first-half points broke the school record of 55 set in 1947.

October 29: Purdue

Special teams stood out as Penn State defeated the Boilermakers 33–15. Ethan Kilmer had six special teams tackles and a forced fumble that led to a field goal. Kevin Kelly was four for four on field goals. Rodney Kinlaw would return a kickoff 58 yards that set up a touchdown.

Michael Robinson would finish 13 of 29 for 213 yards passing and rushed for 96 yards on 19 carries and a touchdown. Tony Hunt would gain 129 yards on 24 carries, his fourth 100-yard rushing game this season. Fullback BranDon Snow would score his first two career touchdowns on runs of 2 and 4 yards.

November 5: Wisconsin

On senior day with the Big Ten title on the line in front of the season's second student White Out, Penn State cruised to a convincing 35–14 win over the Badgers behind the strong performance of both the offense and defense. The Lions struck first with a 43-yard pass from Michael Robinson to Deon Butler on the first drive. Butler would finish with five catches for 125 yards. Robinson finished 13 of 28 for 238 yards, two interceptions and two touchdowns, both to Butler, and also rush for 125 yards on 16 carries. Tony Hunt rushed for 151 yards on 24 carries and two touchdowns.

Wisconsin tailback Brian Calhoun, a Heisman Trophy candidate, entered the game ranked fifth nationally in all-purpose yardage and rushing yardage and led the nation with 21 touchdowns. However, the defense limited Calhoun to only 38 yard rushing. The Lions defense was also constantly in the Badgers backfield, tallying nine sacks, four by Tamba Hali who also had nine tackles. Wisconsin's net rushing yardage was minus-11 yards. Alan Zemaitis and Calvin Lowry each intercepted the Badgers once.

Hali was named the Walter Camp National Defensive Player of the Week and the Big Ten Defensive Player of the Week. He was also named Player of the Week by Sporting News, Sports Illustrated and USA Today.

November 19: Michigan State

ESPN's College Gameday broadcast from East Lansing, covering a Penn State game for the second time this season.

The Lions captured the Big Ten title and a BCS bowl berth with a 31–22 win over the Spartans. Alan Zemaitis intercepted Spartans quarterback Drew Stanton three times and also tallied seven tackles. Nickelback Donnie Johnson also had an interception to preserve a 17–0 Lions lead at the half. Johnson's biggest play however may be a blocked punt earlier in the second quarter that was recovered by backup fullback Matt Hahn in the end zone, his first career touchdown.

Michael Robinson finished 10 of 20 for 105 yards and a touchdown and also rushed for 90 yards on 13 carries, including a 33-yard touchdown run, the longest rushing touchdown of his career. Tony Hunt finished with 89 yards on 20 carries and a touchdown, pushing him past 1,000 yards rushing this season.

Zemaitis was named Walter Camp National Defensive Player of the Week and the Big Ten Defensive Player of the Week. Johnson was named the Big Ten Special Teams Player of the Week.

January 3: 2006 Orange Bowl – Florida State

It was nearly 1:00 a.m. local time as Kevin Kelly kicked the game-winning field goal to end the triple overtime thriller 26–23 against the Seminoles. It was Kelly's third attempt to win the game, after missing at the end of regulation and in the first overtime. The teams traded touchdowns in the second overtime, and Florida State kicker Gary Cismesia missed in the first and third overtimes.

Austin Scott led the Penn State rushing attack, filling in for an injured Tony Hunt who left the game on the first possession. Scott finished with 26 carries for 110 yards and two touchdowns. Michael Robinson was 21 of 39 for 253 yards passing, including a 24-yard touchdown pass to Ethan Kilmer, who made an acrobatic catch in the end zone over the back of a Seminoles defender at the end of the first half.

Penn State's receivers also posted a number of career highs. Kilmer set career highs with six catches for 79 yards and a touchdown. Jordan Norwood had career highs with six receptions for 110 yards, and Justin King made a career-high five receptions for 27 yards.

Paul Posluszny injured his knee in the fourth quarter while attempting to leap over a blocker, causing partial tears of his posterior cruciate ligament (PCL) and medial collateral ligament (MCL). The injury would not require surgery but needed six to eight weeks to rehabilitate.

Rankings

Awards

Watchlists

 Dan Connor
 Chuck Bednarik Award watchlist
 Tamba Hali
 Ted Hendricks Award finalist
 Bronko Nagurski Trophy finalist
 Tony Hunt
 Maxwell Award watchlist
 Jeremy Kapinos
 Ray Guy Award watchlist
 Joe Paterno
 AFCA Coach of the Year finalist
 Eddie Robinson Coach of the Year finalist
 George Munger Award semifinalist and finalist
 Paul Posluszny
 Bronko Nagurski Trophy watchlist
 Chuck Bednarik Award watchlist, semifinalist and finalist
 Dick Butkus Award watchlist, semifinalist and finalist
 Lombardi Award semifinalist and finalist
 Michael Robinson
 Maxwell Award watchlist
 Davey O'Brien Award semifinalist
 Johnny Unitas Golden Arm Award watchlist
 Alan Zemaitis
 Bronko Nagurski Trophy watchlist
 Chuck Bednarik Award watchlist
 Jim Thorpe Award watchlist and semifinalist

Players

 Jay Alford
 ESPN.com All-Bowl Team
 Second-team All-Big Ten (conference media selection)
 Levi Brown
 First-team All-Big Ten (conference coaches selection)
 Second-team Associated Press All-American
 Tamba Hali
 AFCA All-American
 First-team Associated Press All-American
 First-team Sporting News All-American
 First-team Walter Camp All-American
 Big Ten Defensive Lineman of the Year
 First-team All-Big Ten
 FWAA All-American
 Sports Illustrated mid-season All-American
 Walter Camp National Defensive Player of the Week (November 5)
 Big Ten Defensive Player of the Week (November 5)
 Sporting News National Player of the Week (November 5)
 Sports Illustrated National Player of the Week (November 5)
 USA Today  Player of the Week (November 5)
 Tony Hunt
 Second-team All-Big Ten (conference coaches selection)
 Donnie Johnson
 Big Ten Special Teams Player of the Week (November 19)
 Jeremy Kapinos
 Big Ten Special Teams Player of the Week (September 3)
 Calvin Lowry
 First-team All-Big Ten (conference coaches selection)
 Nolan McCready
 ESPN The Magazine CoSIDA Academic All-District
 Scott Paxson
 First-team All-Big Ten (conference coaches selection)
 Paul Posluszny
 2005 Bednarik Award winner
 2005 Butkus Award winner
 First-team ESPN The Magazine CoSIDA Academic All-American
 First-team Associated Press All-American
 First-team Sporting News All-American
 First-team Walter Camp All-American
 First-team All-Big Ten
 FWAA All-American
 ESPN The Magazine CoSIDA Academic All-District
 CBS Sports mid-season All-American
 College Football News mid-season All-American
 Sports Illustrated mid-season All-American
 Walter Camp National Defensive Player of the Week (October 1)
 Big Ten Defensive Player of the Week (September 24)
 Big Ten Defensive Player of the Week (October 1)
 Big Ten Defensive Player of the Week (October 8)
 Matthew Rice
 Second-team All-Big Ten (conference media selection)
 Michael Robinson
 Big Ten Offensive Player of the Year (conference coaches selection)
 Chicago Tribune Silver Football Award winner
 Second-team All-Big Ten
 Big Ten Offensive Player of the Week (October 22)
 Derrick Williams
 ESPN/Pontiac Game Changing Performance (September 24)
 Alan Zemaitis
 Second-team Associated Press All-American
 Second-team Walter Camp All-American
 Second-team Sporting News All-American
 First-team All-Big Ten
 Walter Camp National Defensive Player of the Week (November 19)
 Big Ten Defensive Player of the Week (November 19)

Coaches
 Joe Paterno
 AFCA Coach of the Year
 Associated Press Coach of the Year
 Bobby Dodd Coach of the Year
 Home Depot Coach of the Year
 Sporting News College Football Coach of the Year
 Walter Camp Coach of the Year
 George Munger Award winner
 Dave McClain Big Ten Coach of the Year

Other awards
2005 Lambert Trophy winner
FWAA Tostitos Fiesta Bowl National Team of the Week (October 8)

Post season
Penn State finished the season ranked number 3 in both the final AP and Coaches college football polls, earning Penn State its 13th Top 5 finish under Joe Paterno.

The team's unexpected success helped Penn State finish in the top four in football attendance for the 15th consecutive year, averaging 104,859 for seven home games. Three crowds topped 109,000: 109,865 vs. Wisconsin, 109,839 vs. Ohio State, and 109,467 vs. Purdue, ranking two through four as the largest crowds ever at Beaver Stadium. Penn State finished the season with a sellout crowd of 77,773 at the FedEx Orange Bowl.

Instead of declaring early for the NFL draft, Levi Brown and Paul Posluszny both announced their intentions to return for their senior season.

NFL draft
Six seniors would go on and be drafted in the 2006 NFL Draft.

All-star games

References

Penn State
Penn State Nittany Lions football seasons
Lambert-Meadowlands Trophy seasons
Orange Bowl champion seasons
Penn State Nittany Lions football